The News International phone hacking scandal is a controversy involving the News of the World, a now-defunct British tabloid newspaper published by News International — a subsidiary of News Corporation — and the allegations that individuals working for the newspaper engaged in phone hacking, computer hacking, or corruption.

Persons arrested
This table is a list of those who have been arrested by police in connection with the scandal and the current status of their bail. None of those listed below have been charged with any offence since their arrest and three individuals, Laura Elston, James Desborough  and Bethany Usher, have been exonerated.

The barrister for the Metropolitan Police indicated to the Leveson Inquiry that the investigation into phone hacking and related matters is unlikely to be completed until September 2012.

Police
This table contains details of police officers who have featured prominently in the phone hacking scandal.

Newspapers

See also
 News media phone hacking scandal
 News International phone hacking scandal reference lists

References

News International phone hacking scandal